Habberton (formerly Haberton) is an unincorporated community in Prairie Township, Washington County, Arkansas, United States. It is located along the city limits of Goshen at the intersection of Habberton Road and Habberton Avenue.

References

Unincorporated communities in Washington County, Arkansas
Unincorporated communities in Arkansas